Route 89 is a highway in central Missouri.  Its northern terminus is at Route 100 in Chamois; its southern terminus is at Route 28 in Belle.  A short spur of Highway 89 connects with east U.S. Route 50 east of Linn.

Route description
Route 89 starts at an intersection with Route 100. Shortly after, it intersects with Route K. Then as it goes south, it intersects with Route FF. Then it intersects with Route HH. Further south it intersects with Route J. Then it branches off a spur route of Route 89. Further south, it intersects with US 50. US 50 is shared with Route 89 until an intersection in Linn. Then it continues south and then it intersects with Route E. Several miles south it intersects with Route D. Then it intersects with Route Y outside of Belle. Shortly after, it crosses over into Maries County and ends at an intersection with Route 28 in Belle.

History
Route 89 had originally been part of Route 12B, a branch of Route 12, one of the original 1922 state highways.

Major intersections

Route 89 Spur

Route 89 Spur/Route 89Y is a  highway that forms the eastern leg of a Y intersection between Route 89 and US 50 in Osage County.

References 

089
Transportation in Maries County, Missouri
Transportation in Osage County, Missouri